Babi Yar Holocaust Memorial Center (Ukrainian: Меморіальний центр Голокосту «Бабин Яр»), officially the Foundation and Babyn Yar Holocaust Memorial Center, is an educational institution that documents, explains and commemorates the Babi Yar shootings of September 1941 and aims to broaden and sustain the memory of The Holocaust in Eastern Europe, taking into account geopolitical changes during the 20th century. On September 29, 2016, President of Ukraine Petro Poroshenko, together with public figures and philanthropists, initiated the creation of the first Babi Yar Holocaust Memorial Center. The Memorial Center is planned to be opened in Kyiv, Ukraine, in 2025/26.

Babi Yar
On September 29–30 1941, in Babi Yar, a ravine in Kyiv, the Nazis slaughtered more Jews in two days than in any other single German massacre, killing 33,771 Jews. In total, from September 29, 1941, until October 1943, the Nazi occupation authorities killed nearly 100,000 people in and near Babi Yar.

History
On September 29, 2016, President of Ukraine Petro Poroshenko, together with public figures and philanthropists, initiated the creation of the first Babi Yar Holocaust Memorial Center. In his opinion, the creation of the Holocaust Memorial in Babi Yar can become a symbol of the unity of the nation and mother of greatness for the whole world.  Poroshenko himself and the Mayor of Kyiv, Vitali Klitschko, were present at the ceremony.

On March 19, 2017, the Supervisory Board of the Memorial was founded. The Supervisory Board is headed by the chairman of the Jewish Agency for Israel Natan Sharansky and consists of philanthropists German Khan, Mikhail Fridman, Victor Pinchuk, and Pavel Fuks, the chief rabbi of Kyiv and Ukraine Yakov Dov Bleich, artist Svyatoslav Vakarchuk, world heavyweight champion Volodymyr Klitschko, the former Director-General of UNESCO Irina Bokova, former President of Poland Alexander Kwasniewski, former Minister of Foreign Affairs of Germany Joschka Fischer.

On October 19, 2017, the leadership of the Babi Yar Holocaust Memorial Center met with the Prime Minister of Ukraine Volodymyr Groysman. The Prime Minister expressed support for the project to build a memorial complex in Kyiv to commemorate the victims of Babi Yar, and noted the importance of preserving historical memory in order to prevent the recurrence of past mistakes in the future.

On 6 October 2021, following the 80th anniversary of the massacre, the Memorial Center released the first 161 names of Nazi soldiers who were perpetrators of the crimes at Babi Yar. It described the release of names as the first installment of ongoing research into those who committed the murder of 33,771 Ukrainian Jews on September 29 and 30, 1941. The Memorial Center is planned to be created in Kyiv, Ukraine, by 2023. 

On 1 March 2022, the site of Babyn Yar was claimed to have been hit by Russian missiles and shells during the battle of Kyiv, killing at least five people. Ukrainian president Volodymyr Zelenskyy and Andriy Yermak, chairman of the Ukrainian Presidential Office, condemned the missile attack, as did Israeli leaders including Foreign Minister Yair Lapid and Diaspora Affairs Minister Nachman Shai.

Ynet journalist Ron Ben Yishai reported that Babi Yar remained unscathed after the Russian attack.

See also
 Babi Yar memorials

References

External links

 

The Holocaust in Ukraine
Babi Yar
Holocaust museums
Museums in Kyiv
Proposed museums